The Spokane Flyers were a junior ice hockey team that played one and a half seasons in the Western Hockey League from 1980–1982.  They played in Spokane, Washington, United States.

History
This team is not to be confused with the Spokane Flyers that played in Canadian Senior Amateur Hockey and won the Allan Cup championships in 1976 and 1980.

The Spokane Flyers entered the WHL on May 15, 1980 when Bob Cooper, owner of the dormant Great Falls Americans franchise, resurrected his team and relocated it to Spokane for the 1980–81 WHL season.  Like the Americans, the Flyers would quickly cease operations, as the franchise folded on December 2, 1981 just 26 games into its second season.

It was widely believed that the failure of the Flyers was due to management. Spokane would have a second chance in the WHL when the relocated Kelowna Wings renamed themselves the Spokane Chiefs.
 
The Flyers franchise first joined the then-named Western Canada Hockey League (WCHL) in 1967 as the Flin Flon Bombers.  The franchise had a great deal of stability in Flin Flon, Manitoba and lasted eleven seasons in the community before the WHL outgrew it.  The Bombers relocated to Edmonton, Alberta for one season in 1978 before being sold and relocating again to Great Falls, Montana.  The Great Falls Americans failed to last even one season, as they ceased operations in December, having played 28 of a scheduled 72 games of the 1979–80 WHL season. Cooper resurrected them again in Spokane for the start of the 1980–81 season, though they would fold again in December of the following 1981–82 WHL season.

The Flyers were posthumously involved in one of the most bizarre trades in hockey history.  After ceasing operations, the Flyers team bus was sold to the Victoria Cougars.  The Cougars owners were not willing to pay the duties and taxes required to bring the vehicle into Canada, so on December 19, 1983, the Cougars traded the bus to the Seattle Breakers for holdout Tom Martin.

Season-by-season Record
Note: GP = Games played, W = Wins, L = Losses, T = Ties Pts = Points, GF = Goals for, GA = Goals against

See also
Great Falls Americans
Spokane Chiefs
Spokane Jets

References
whl.ca
logoserver.com
2005–06 WHL Guide

Defunct ice hockey teams in the United States
Sports in Spokane, Washington
Defunct Western Hockey League teams
Ice hockey teams in Washington (state)